Weißenfelser Land is a former Verwaltungsgemeinschaft ("collective municipality") in the Burgenlandkreis (district), in Saxony-Anhalt, Germany. The seat of the Verwaltungsgemeinschaft was in Weißenfels. It was disbanded in September 2010.

The Verwaltungsgemeinschaft Weißenfelser Land consisted of the following municipalities:

 Leißling
 Weißenfels

References

Former Verwaltungsgemeinschaften in Saxony-Anhalt